John McQuillan (born 20 July 1970) is a Scottish former professional footballer.

Career
McQuillan, a right-back, began his career with his hometown club Stranraer in 1986, despite having already played for Dundee United's victorious youth side in the Milk Cup earlier that year. After one season at Stair Park, McQuillan returned to Tayside but signed for United's rivals Dundee, beginning an eight-year stay at Dens Park. In 1991–92, McQuillan was part of Dundee's First Division-winning side, although he suffered relegation from the Premier Division two seasons later. At the beginning of the 1995–96 season, McQuillan moved to Tayside rivals St Johnstone, picking up another First Division title the following season. In March 2000, weeks before the end of his contract, McQuillan moved to Dundee United for £50,000. Featuring as a first-choice in the remainder of that season, McQuillan played in fifteen matches the 2000–01 season before moving on loan to Alloa Athletic for the final months of the season. McQuillan started the 2001–02 season on loan at Montrose and in February 2002, made his loan spell permanent, going on to spend another two seasons at Links Park before playing his final match in May 2004.

It is unknown whether McQuillan stayed in football after retiring.

Career statistics

External links

References

1970 births
Living people
People from Stranraer
Scottish footballers
Stranraer F.C. players
Dundee F.C. players
St Johnstone F.C. players
Dundee United F.C. players
Alloa Athletic F.C. players
Montrose F.C. players
Scottish Premier League players
Scottish Football League players
Association football fullbacks
Footballers from Dumfries and Galloway